In computer science, a computation is said to diverge if it does not terminate or terminates in an exceptional state. Otherwise it is said to converge. In domains where computations are expected to be infinite, such as process calculi, a computation is said to diverge if it fails to be productive (i.e. to continue producing an action within a finite amount of time).

Definitions 
Various subfields of computer science use varying, but mathematically precise, definitions of what it means for a computation to converge or diverge.

Rewriting 
In abstract rewriting, an abstract rewriting system is called convergent if it is both confluent and terminating.

The notation t ↓ n means that t reduces to normal form n in zero or more reductions, t↓ means t reduces to some normal form in zero or more reductions, and t↑ means t does not reduce to a normal form; the latter is impossible in a terminating rewriting system.

In the lambda calculus an expression is divergent if it has no normal form.

Denotational semantics 
In denotational semantics an object function f : A → B can be modelled as a mathematical function  where ⊥ (bottom) indicates that the object function or its argument diverges.

Concurrency theory 
In the calculus of communicating sequential processes, divergence is a drastic situation where a process performs an endless series of hidden actions. For example, consider the following process, defined by CSP notation:

The traces of this process are defined as:

Now, consider the following process, which conceals the tick event of the Clock process:

By definition, P is called a divergent process.

See also 
 Infinite loop
 Termination analysis

Notes

References 
 
 
 J. M. R. Martin and S. A. Jassim (1997). "How to Design Deadlock-Free Networks Using CSP and Verification Tools: A Tutorial Introduction" in Proceedings of the WoTUG-20.

Programming language theory
Process (computing)
Rewriting systems
Lambda calculus
Denotational semantics